The 2006 Three Days of De Panne was the 30th edition of the Three Days of De Panne cycle race and was held on 28 March to 30 March 2006. The race started in Middelkerke and finished in De Panne. The race was won by Leif Hoste.

General classification

References

Three Days of Bruges–De Panne
2006 in Belgian sport